John Francis Xavier Diffley   (born 4 March 1958) is an American biochemist and Associate Research Director at the Francis Crick Institute. He is known for his contributions to the understanding of how DNA replication is initiated, and how it is subsequently regulated throughout the cell cycle and in response to DNA damage.

Research and career 
Diffley was educated at New York University, obtaining his Ph.D. in 1985. He then worked as a postdoctoral researcher with Bruce Stillman at Cold Spring Harbor Laboratory. In 1990, he established his own research group at the Clare Hall Laboratories, Cancer Research UK, which is now part of the Francis Crick Institute. His group studies the mechanism and regulation of eukaryotic DNA replication.

Awards and honours 
In 1998, Diffley was elected a member of European Molecular Biology Organisation (EMBO). He is also an elected member of Academia Europaea (2009) and the European Academy of Cancer Sciences (2011). He was elected a Fellow of the Royal Society (FRS) in 2005, Fellow of the American Association for the Advancement of Science (AAAS) in 2007, and Fellow of the Academy of Medical Sciences (FMedSci) in 2011. 

He is a recipient of the Paul Marks Prize for Cancer Research (2003), the Louis-Jeantet Prize for Medicine(2016) and the Canada Gairdner International Award (2019). He was elected to the National Academy of Sciences in 2020.

References

1958 births
Living people
American emigrants to England
Fellows of the Royal Society
American molecular biologists
Naturalised citizens of the United Kingdom
New York University alumni
Scientists from New York City